Ludovica or Ludovika or Ludowika is a feminine given name, a counterpart of the masculine names Ludovic or Ludovico and the related Louis or Ludwig. As of 2021, it was among the ten most popular names for newborn girls in Italy.

People
Ludovica Albertoni (1473-1533), Italian Roman Catholic noblewoman from the Renaissance period and a professed member of the Third Order of Saint Francis
Princess Ludovika of Bavaria (1808-1892), daughter of King Maximilian I Joseph of Bavaria and his second wife, Karoline of Baden, and the mother of Empress Elisabeth of Austria
Ludovica Caramis (born 1991), Italian model and showgirl
Ludovica Cavalli (born 2000), Italian athlete
Maria Ludovica Costa (born 2000), Italian rower for Rowing Club Genovese
Ludovica Levy (1856-1922), Danish actress, theatre director and theatre critic
Ludovica Modugno (1949-2021), Italian actress
Ludovica Thornam (1853-1896), Danish portrait and genre painter
Ludovica Torelli (1500-1569), ruling Countess of Guastalla in 1522–1539
Ludowika Margaretha of Zweibrücken-Bitsch (1540-1569), noblewoman

Other uses
 292 Ludovica, a Main-belt asteroid
 Ludovica Academy, former military training institute in Hungary

Notes

Italian feminine given names